Greek Motorway 90 (A90), also known as Βόρειος Οδικός Άξονας Κρήτης, (BOAK, lit. translated Northern Road Axis of Crete) is a planned Greek highway that is part of the Greek Primary National road network, European Road 65 (From Kissamos to Chania) and European Road 75 .

The motorway would extend over 310 km and connects Kissamos with Sitia.

Highway 90 follows the route of the new Highway 90, (except for the Gournes-Hersonissos section in Heraklion where a viaduct was built in the Aposelemi Gorge bypassing the former road route). Highway 90 replaced the old Highway from the late 60's. Construction began in the 1990s, but to date, sections were turned into a 22 m long four-lane highway and for the most part is a trunk road. The completion date of the entire motorway is 2028.

Route 
Highway 90, once completed, will cross North Crete, starting at Kissamos and ending at Sitia, following exactly the route of National Road 90.

Cities 
Motorway 90 passes near Chania, Rethymno, Heraklion and Agios Nikolaos.

Airports 
Motorway 90 connects to the following airports: Chania, Heraklion and Sitia and will also connect to the new Heraklion airport at Kasteli.

Marine Ports 
Motorway 90 connects to marine ports Kavonisi, Kissamos, Chania, Rethymno, Heraklion, Agios Nikolaos and Sitia

History 
In the 1990s, National Road 90, built in the late 1960s, experienced traffic congestion. The road began to be rebuilt into a four-lane highway with a median strip. The first section was 16 kilometers in length.

ΕΥΔΕ BOAK (Ειδική Υπηρεσία Δημοσίων Έργων ΒΟΑΚ - Special State Works Service VOAK), was to manage the design and construction of Greek State Works. Median strips had dramatically reduced accidents. In the section from Linoperama to Giofyros, 1999-2001 deaths number 23, declining in the 2002-2005 period to 2.

By 2019 only  51 km were upgraded to 4 lane highway with emergency lane and medial strip, 9 km around Chania, 7 km around Rethymnon and 35 km in the prefecture of Heraklion, from Linoperamata to Hersonissos.

In the widened sections around the cities of Chania, Rethymnon and Heraklion, the upgrading/widening of the road was aimed at addressing traffic loads and was based on the road plan of 1968. Speed limits do not exceed 90 km/h, with the exception of the Gournes-Hersonissos section, the only section of the road that meets modern standards.

The Greek Ministry of Infrastructure plans the complete upgrade of the road to a four-lane highway. The project has to be done in two phases: Chania-Agios Nikolaos and Kissamos-Chania and Agios Nikolaos-Sitia.

At the beginning of 2020, two possible scenarios were announced for the financing of the road. The first scenario concerns the government receiving revenue from another concession. The problem is that creditors need approval because part of that money goes to public debt service. In the second scenario, central bank refunds can be used to finance the project, which is being considered at the highest government level.

Reconstruction of the road will begin after 2022 with completion of the entire motorway scheduled for 2028.

Safety 
Traffic accidents often occur on the road. Although it is partly due to the human factor, the road has 

 High traffic load
 is constructed to obsolete specifications 
 inadequate maintenance.

Images

References 

Motorways in Greece